Dunbar Glass Co. was a glassmaking company in Dunbar, West Virginia. It operated from 1913 to 1953. 

Some of the company's craftsmen formed Kanawha Glass Company when the Dunbar Glass company folded.

Defunct glassmaking companies
Manufacturing companies established in 1913
Kanawha County, West Virginia
1913 establishments in West Virginia